Dimitrios Anakoglou (born 6 September 1991) is a Greek professional footballer who plays as a midfielder for Super League 2 club Panserraikos.

Career

Panserraikos
Dimitris Anakoglou began his football career in 2008. Within four years and six months, he managed to compete in 89 games scoring 5 times. His good performances led him to play in nine games with the Greece National Team U19 and U21.

AEK Athens
In January 2013, AEK Athens bought Anakoglou from Panserraikos. Although he was immediately loved by the fans of AEK, he did not play many games; He played in 3 games. After the relegation of the team, he renewed his contract with AEK for 4 years.
Anakoglou has been a mainstay in the midfield of AEK during their battle to return to Greece's top flight helping them with back to back promotions from the third tier back to the Super League in just 2 seasons, he also captained the side on many occasions due to the absence of Georgeas and Cordero. From 2015-16 season and the return of AEK at the Superleague Greece, Anakoglou became the first captain of the team. On 25 July 2016, AEK Athens terminated the contract of central midfielder and former captain of the club, who had joined the 2016 Greek Cup winners in January 2013.

Loan to Veria
On 1 February 2016, Anakoglou was loaned to Superleague side Veria until the end of season. On 7 February 2016, he made his debut with the club, scored in a 2-0 home win against Kalloni helping his club to gain its first victory in 2016.

Aris
On the 2 August 2016 Anakoglou signed with Aris for 2 years.
On 6 April 2017, during club's training workout Anakoglou seriously injured, after a duel with Miguel Sebastián Garcia. A day later, Anakoglou had a surgery, faced a cruciate ligament rupture that probably kept him out of the team for 6 months.

Lamia
On 4 July 2019, Lamia officially announced the signing of Anakoglou on a free transfer.

Career statistics

Club

Honours
AEK Athens
Football League: 2014–15 (South Group)
Football League 2: 2013–14 (6th Group)

References

External links
Scoresway.com Profile
Profile at Onsports.gr

1991 births
Living people
Greek footballers
Greece under-21 international footballers
Greece youth international footballers
Super League Greece players
Football League (Greece) players
Panserraikos F.C. players
AEK Athens F.C. players
Veria F.C. players
Aris Thessaloniki F.C. players
Association football midfielders
Footballers from Serres